Rätzlingen is a municipality in the district of Uelzen, in Lower Saxony, Germany.

References

Municipalities in Lower Saxony
Uelzen (district)